Jesper Juul may refer to:
 Jesper Juul (family therapist)
 Jesper Juul (game researcher)